is a publishing label affiliated with the Japanese publishing company SB Creative, a subsidiary of Softbank. It was established in January 2006 and is a light novel label. The label is aimed at males in their teens to their twenties.

Light novels published under GA Bunko

0–9

A

B

C

D

E

F

G

H

I

J

K

L

M

N

O

P

Q

R

S

T

U

V

W

Y

Z

External links
GA Bunko's official website  

 
Book publishing company imprints
Light novel labels
SoftBank Group